The  are an American early punk band, that are often cited as an inspiration to many around the LA punk scene of the late 1970s and early 1980s. Their music predates hardcore and is an aggressive yet melodic bridge. The Cheifs are often cited as the band that bridged the gap between West Coast punk and hardcore. They were a favorite of bands like The Descendents and Bad Religion. Their 45 EP "Blues" (Playgems, 1980) sells for $250 to $400. They have been included on Killed By Death compilations, and in 1997 a CD of their collective works was released.

Misspelling 
Around 1979, Glassley had an uncle die from leukemia. He had worked as a butcher and always wore plain white T-shirts. When he died, Glassley inherited those shirts. One afternoon he bought some red and black spray paint, went to his room at Holly-West, and made band shirts. When he showed them to the rest of the band, the reaction was a resounding, "Ah dude, you spelled it wrong! On every single one of them!"

History 
On October 17, 2017, cancer claimed the life of founding band member, Bob Glassley.

Formation 
Hollywood, California, US
 Jerry Koskie – vocals
 George Walker – guitars
 Bob Glassley – bass
 Rabit – drums

Recordings 
 "Blues" (7" single) 1980
 Holly-West Crisis (CD) 1997

Compilations
 Chunks US 12" 1981 (New Alliance): The Lonelys
 Who Cares US LP 1981 (American Standard): No Justice / Riot Squad / Scrapped
 Killed By Death #2 US LP 1989 (Redrum): Blues
 Bloodstains Across California US LP 1993 (Bloodstains): Tower 18

Current members 
 Brad Castlen – vocals
 Scott Hedeen – guitars
 Bob Glassley – bass
 James Joyce – drums

References 
 Gibbon, Punky "Punk Hardcore Oi! New Wave Post-Punk" Punky Gibbon.
 Radford, Chad "Cheifin' Out" Creative Loafing.

Punk rock groups from California
Musical groups from Los Angeles
Musical groups established in 1979
Musical groups disestablished in 1982
Musical groups reestablished in 2016